Launcells is a hamlet and civil parish in north-east Cornwall, England, United Kingdom.

Within the civil parish are the hamlets of Launcells Cross, Red Post, Grimscott, and Buttsbear Cross. In 2001, 563 people lived within the civil parish, decreasing to 531 at the 2011 census.

Geography
The River Tamar forms the eastern boundary of the civil parish, as well as the Cornish boundary with Devon.

Parish church
The parish church is dedicated to St Swithin: nearby, in the wooded valley is the holy well of St Swithin. There are two aisles but the arcades differ: while the north is of granite the south is of older Polyphant stone. The fine series of over 60 benchends is from the same workshop as those of Kilkhampton and Poughill. Other features of interest are the medieval wall painting and the tomb of Sir John Chamond, 1624.

The church also features an unusual post-Reformation wall painting which has been dated between 1680-1690.

Charles Henderson writing in 1925 gives the dedication as to St Andrew. The origin of the name Launcells is probably from Lan- and a personal name Kellys. In the early Middle Ages the church belonged to Hartland Abbey and there are records of a dispute over the building of the chancel in 1382 which required episcopal intervention. Unusually for a Cornish church it has not been affected by Victorian or later restorations.

References

External links

Civil parishes in Cornwall
Hamlets in Cornwall